Lurkers at Sunlight's Edge is a Big Finish Productions audio drama based on the long-running British science fiction television series Doctor Who.

Plot
In 1934, off the coast of Alaska, a mysterious four-year-old island is stirring.  Within it is a vast citadel, where the Dreamers sleep.  Also on the island is an institute, where a Lovecraftian horror writer has a terrible secret that even he doesn't know.

Cast
Seventh Doctor – Sylvester McCoy
Ace – Sophie Aldred
Hex – Philip Olivier
CP Doveday – Michael Brandon
Dr Freya Gabriel – Kate Terence
Emerson Whytecrag – Stuart Milligan
Professor August Corbin – Alex Lowe
Slade – Sam Clemens
Captain Akins – Duncan Wisbey

Continuity
Black and White contains a few scenes that take place directly after Lurkers at Sunlight's Edge, including one that leads into Robophobia.

External links
Big Finish Productions – Lurkers at Sunlight's Edge 

2010 audio plays
Seventh Doctor audio plays
Fiction set in 1934
Lovecraftian horror